Sigbjørn Apeland (born 10 May 1966 was raised in Sveio, Norway) is a musician (organ and Harmonium) and scientist, known from several recordings and for his work in the borderland between folk music, church music and improvisational music.

Career 

Apeland is a graduate in performing Church music at the Rogaland Musikkonservatorium (1988) and ethnomusicology from University of Bergen (1998), before he as fellow at Griegakademiet completed his Dr. art. with the thesis Kyrkjemusikkdiskursen: Musikklivet i Den norske kyrkja som diskursiv praksis (Church music discourse: The music scene in the Norwegian church as discursive practice, 2005).

Apeland contributes on numerous album releases by Nils Økland (1995–), Reidun Horvei (1998), Ingeleiv Kvammen and Olav Kvammen (2000), Åsne Valland Nordli (2001), Marylands (2001), and Agnes Buen Garnås (2002). For the Vossajazz he released the album Fryd (1998), in collaboration with Berit Opheim (vocals), Bjørn Kjellemyr (bass), Einar Mjølsnes (Hardingfele) and Per Jørgensen (trumpet). With Berit Opheim he released the album Den Blide Sol (2007).

Apeland often plays together with county musicians in Hordaland, he also collaborates with the fiddle player Synnøve S. Bjørset, and with Knut Hamre, Hildegun Riise and Benedicte Maurseth.

Honors 
2014: Vossajazzprisen

Discography

Solo albums 
2011: Glossolalia (Hubro Music)

Collaborations 
1998: Sette Meg I Huskestong (NorCD), with Småkvedarane frå Voss
1998: Fryd (Vossa Jazz Records), with Einar Mjølsnes, Per Jørgensen, Berit Opheim & Bjørn Kjellemyr
2007: Den Blide Sol (NorCD), with Berit Opheim
2009: 1982 (NorCD), with Øyvind Skarbø & Nils Økland
2011: Lysøen - Hommage À Ole Bull (ECM Records), with Nils Økland recorded at Lysøen
2016: Bumblin' Creed (Northern Spy), with Padang Food Tigers

References

External links 

 

Norwegian traditional musicians
20th-century Norwegian organists
21st-century Norwegian organists
Male organists
Academic staff of the University of Stavanger
Hubro Music artists
ECM Records artists
University of Bergen alumni
Musicians from Sveio
1966 births
Living people
20th-century Norwegian male musicians
21st-century Norwegian male musicians
Agbaland members
NorCD artists
Northern Spy Records artists
Academic staff of the University of Bergen